The North Zone section of the 1998 Indian Federation Cup qualification saw nine teams competing for one or two berths in the final tournament. It was held between August 2nd and 10th of 1998. One club, JCT Mills qualified for the final tournament and the another, Punjab State Electricity Board, qualified for the play-offs. Post the final game, former footballer Inder Singh was honored by the Chandigarh Football Association.

Matches

Qualifying

Quarter-finals

Semi-finals

Final

References

External links
 1998–99 Federation Cup

1998–99 in Indian football